Soyuz-1 may refer to:

 Soyuz 1, the first manned flight of the Soyuz programme
 Soyuz TM-31, the first Soyuz mission to the International Space Station
 Soyuz-1 (rocket), a proposed Russian carrier rocket
 Soyuz (spacecraft) 's first generation class

See also
 Soyuz-L
 Soyuz T-1
 Soyuz TM-1
 Soyuz TMA-1
 Soyuz TMA-01M
 Soyuz MS-01
 Soyuz (disambiguation)